Aristofusus is a genus of sea snails in the family Fasciolariidae.

Species
Species within the genus Aristofusus include:
Aristofusus benjamini (Hadorn, 1997)
Aristofusus couei (Petit de la Saussaye, 1853)
Aristofusus excavatus (Sowerby II, 1880)
Aristofusus helenae (Bartsch, 1939)
Aristofusus stegeri (Lyons, 1978)

References

 
Gastropod genera